Maria Anatolyevna Bondareva (born 28 November 1999) is a Russian former artistic gymnast. She was a member of the team that won the gold medal at the 2014 Junior European Championships. She is the 2013 European Youth Olympic Festival champion on the balance beam and with the team.

Career

Junior

2012 
Bondareva competed at the International Gymnix in Montreal and helped her team win the gold medal. She also won the gold medal in the all-around and on the uneven bars, balance beam, and floor exercise. She won the all-around gold medal at the Russian Championships in the Candidate Master of Sport category with a total score of 56.867. At the City of Jesolo Trophy, she helped the junior Russian team win the bronze medal, and she placed eighth in the all-around.

2013 
Bondareva competed at the International Gymnix and helped the Russian team win the gold medal. She also tied for gold in the all-around with her teammate, Anastasia Dmitrieva, and she won the silver medal on the balance beam. Then at the Lugano Trophy, she won the silver medal in the all-around behind Romanian gymnast Andreea Munteanu.

At the European Youth Olympic Festival, Bondareva won the team gold medal alongside Maria Kharenkova and Viktoria Kuzmina. She won the gold medal on the balance beam. She placed fifth in the all-around final with a score of 54.200. Then at the Japan Junior International, she placed sixth in the all-around and won the bronze medal on the uneven bars behind American Bailie Key and Romanian Andreea Iridon.

2014 
Bondareva competed at the Junior Russian Championships, and she won the gold medal with her team. However, she pulled out of the all-around and event finals. At the European Championships she competed alongside Angelina Melnikova, Seda Tutkhalyan, Anastasia Dmitrieva, and Daria Skrypnik, and they won the team gold medal. In November, she competed at the KSI-Matsz Cup in Budapest and won the bronze medal in the all-around behind Ekaterina Sokova and Zsofia Kovacs.

Senior

2015 
Bondareva became age-eligible for senior competition in 2015. In March, she competed at the Russian Championships in Penza. She won the gold medal with her team, and she placed eighth in the all-around, uneven bars, and floor exercise. She then competed at a friendly meet against Italy, Romania, and Colombia, and the Russian team won the gold medal. In October, she retired from gymnastics due to a back injury.

Competitive history

References

External links 
Maria Bondareva on VK

Russian female artistic gymnasts
1999 births
Living people
People from Fryazino
European champions in gymnastics
Sportspeople from Moscow Oblast
21st-century Russian women